Preston-le-Skerne is a hamlet in the civil parish of Mordon, County Durham, in England. It is situated a short distance to the east of Newton Aycliffe.

References

External links

Villages in County Durham